The Martin B-26 Marauder is an American twin-engined medium bomber that saw extensive service during World War II. The B-26 was built at two locations: Baltimore, Maryland, and Omaha, Nebraska, by the Glenn L. Martin Company.

First used in the Pacific Theater of World War II in early 1942, it was also used in the Mediterranean Theater and in Western Europe.

After entering service with the United States Army aviation units, the aircraft quickly received the reputation of a "widowmaker" due to the early models' high accident rate during takeoffs and landings. This was because the Marauder had to be flown at precise airspeeds, particularly on final runway approach or when one engine was out. The unusually high 150 mph (241 km/h) speed on short final runway approach was intimidating to many pilots who were used to much slower approach speeds, and when they slowed to speeds below those stipulated in the manual the aircraft would often stall and crash.

The B-26 became a safer aircraft once crews were re-trained, and after aerodynamics modifications (an increase of wingspan and wing angle-of-incidence to give better takeoff performance, and a larger vertical stabilizer and rudder). The Marauder ended World War II with the lowest loss rate  of any U.S. Army Air Forces bomber.

A total of 5,288 were produced between February 1941 and March 1945; 522 of these were flown by the Royal Air Force and the South African Air Force. By the time the United States Air Force was created as an independent military service separate from the United States Army in 1947, all Martin B-26s had been retired from U.S. service. After the Marauder was retired the unrelated Douglas A-26 Invader then assumed the "B-26" designation which led to confusion between the two aircraft.

Design and development
On 5 July 1939, the Glenn L. Martin Company submitted its design, produced by a team led by Peyton M. Magruder, to meet the requirement, the Martin Model 179. Martin's design was evaluated as superior to the other proposals and was awarded a contract for 201 aircraft, to be designated B-26. The B-26 went from paper concept to an operational bomber in approximately two years. Additional orders for a further 930 B-26s followed in September 1940, still prior to the first flight of the type.

The B-26 was a shoulder-winged monoplane of all-metal construction, fitted with a tricycle landing gear. It had a streamlined, circular section fuselage housing the crew, consisting of a bombardier in the nose, armed with a  machine gun, a pilot and co-pilot sitting side by side, with positions for the radio operator and navigator behind the pilots. A gunner manned a dorsal turret armed with two  machine guns (the first powered dorsal turret to be fitted to a U.S. bomber), and an additional  machine gun was fitted in the tail.

Two bomb bays were fitted mid-fuselage, capable of carrying  of bombs, although in practice such a bomb load reduced range too much, and the aft bomb bay was usually fitted with additional fuel tanks instead of bombs. The aircraft was powered by two Pratt & Whitney R-2800 Double Wasp radial engines in nacelles slung under the wing, driving four-bladed propellers. The engines were manufactured at the Ford Dearborn Engine plant in Dearborn, Michigan.

The first B-26, with Martin test pilot William K. "Ken" Ebel at the controls, flew on 25 November 1940 and was effectively the prototype. Deliveries to the U.S. Army Air Corps began in February 1941 with the second aircraft, 40-1362. In March 1941, the Army Air Corps started Accelerated Service Testing of the B-26 at Patterson Field, near Dayton, Ohio.

Accidents

The B-26's relatively small wing area and resulting high wing loading required a high landing speed of  indicated airspeed depending on load. At least two of the earliest B-26s suffered hard landings and damage to the main landing gear, engine mounts, propellers and fuselage. The type was grounded briefly in April 1941 to investigate the landing difficulties. Two causes were found: insufficient landing speed (producing a stall) and improper weight distribution. The latter was due to the lack of a dorsal turret; the Martin power turret was not yet ready.

Some of the very earliest B-26s suffered collapses of the nose landing gear. It is said that they were caused by improper weight distribution, but that is not likely to have been the only reason. The incidents occurred during low-speed taxiing, takeoffs and landings, and occasionally the strut unlocked. Later the Martin electric dorsal turret was retrofitted to some of the first B-26s. Martin also began testing a taller vertical stabilizer and revised tail gunner's position in 1941.

The Pratt & Whitney R-2800-5 engines were reliable, but the Curtiss electric pitch change mechanism in the propellers required impeccable maintenance, not always attainable in the field. Human error and some failures of the mechanism occasionally placed the propeller blades in flat pitch resulting in an overspeeding propeller, sometimes known as a "runaway prop". Due to its sound and the possibility that the propeller blades could disintegrate, this situation was particularly frightening for aircrews. More challenging was a loss of power in one engine during takeoff. These and other malfunctions, as well as human error, claimed a number of aircraft and the commanding officer of the 22nd Bombardment Group, Colonel Mark Lewis.

The Martin B-26 suffered only two fatal accidents during its first year of flight, from November 1940 to November 1941: a crash shortly after takeoff near Martin's Middle River plant in Maryland (cause unknown, but engine malfunction strongly suggested) and the loss of a 38th Bombardment Group B-26 when its vertical stabilizer and rudder separated from the aircraft at altitude (cause unknown, but the accident report discussed the possibility that a canopy hatch broke off and struck the vertical stabilizer).

As pilots were trained quickly for the war, relatively inexperienced pilots entered the cockpit and the accident rate increased. This occurred at the same time as more experienced B-26 pilots of the 22nd, 38th and 42nd Bombardment Groups were proving the merits of the bomber.

For a time in 1942, pilots in training believed that the B-26 could not be flown on one engine. This was disproved by several experienced pilots, including Colonel Jimmy Doolittle, who flew demonstration flights at MacDill Army Air Field, which featured take offs and landings with only one engine. Also, seventeen Women Airforce Service Pilots were trained to demonstrate the B-26, in an attempt to "shame" male pilots into the air.

In 1942, aviation pioneer and company founder Glenn L. Martin was called before the Senate Special Committee to Investigate the National Defense Program, (or also known as the "Truman Committee"), which was investigating defense contracting abuses. Senator Harry S Truman of Missouri, the committee chairman (and future Vice President and 33rd President of the United States in 1945-1952), asked Martin why the B-26 had problems. Martin responded that the wings were too short. Senator Truman curtly asked why the wings had not been changed. When Martin replied that the plans were too close to completion, and his company already had the contract, Truman's testy response was quick and to the point: In that case, the contract would be canceled. Martin corrected the wings. (By February 1943, the newest model aircraft, the B-26B-10, had an additional  of wingspan, plus uprated engines, more armor and larger guns.)

Indeed, the regularity of crashes by pilots training at MacDill Field — up to 15 in one 30-day period — led to the exaggerated catchphrase, "One a day in Tampa Bay." Apart from accidents occurring over land, 13 Marauders ditched in Tampa Bay in the 14 months between 5 August 1942 and 8 October 1943.

B-26 crews gave the aircraft the nickname "Widowmaker". Other colorful nicknames included "Martin Murderer", "Flying Coffin", "B-Dash-Crash", "Flying Prostitute" (so-named because it was so fast and had "no visible means of support," referring to its small wings) and "Baltimore Whore" (a reference to the city where Martin was based).

According to an article in the April 2009 edition of AOPA Pilot on Kermit Weeks' "Fantasy of Flight", the Marauder had a tendency to "hunt" in yaw. This instability is similar to "Dutch roll". This would make for a very uncomfortable ride, especially for the tail gunner.

The B-26 is stated by the 9th Air Force to have had the lowest combat loss rate of any US aircraft used during the war. Nevertheless, it remained a challenging aircraft to fly and continued to be disliked by some of its pilots throughout its military career. In 1944, in answer to many pilots complaining to the press and their relatives back home, the USAAF and Martin took the unusual step during war of commissioning large articles to be placed in various popular publications to educate the public and defend the flying/accident record of the B-26 against "slanders". One of the longest of these articles was in the May 1944 issue of Popular Mechanics.

Operational history

The B-26 Marauder was used mostly in Europe, but also saw action in the Mediterranean and the Pacific. In early combat, the aircraft took heavy losses, but was still one of the most successful medium-range bombers used by the US Army Air Forces. The B-26 was initially deployed on combat missions in the South West Pacific in early 1942, but most of the B-26s subsequently assigned to operational theaters were sent to England and the Mediterranean area.

By the end of World War II, it had flown more than 110,000 sorties, dropped 150,000 tons (136,078 tonnes) of bombs and had been used in combat by British, Free French and South African forces in addition to US units. In 1945, when B-26 production was halted, 5,266 had been built.

Pacific Theater

The B-26 began to equip the 22nd Bombardment Group at Langley Field, Virginia, in February 1941, replacing the Douglas B-18 Bolo, with a further two groups, the 38th and 28th, beginning to equip with the B-26 by December 1941. Immediately following the Japanese Attack on Pearl Harbor, the 22nd BG was deployed to the South West Pacific, first by ship to Hawaii, then its air echelon flew the planes to Australia. The 22nd BG flew its first combat mission, an attack on Rabaul which required an intermediate stop at Port Moresby, New Guinea, on 5 April 1942.

A second group, the 38th, began receiving B-26s in November 1941 and began transitioning into them at Patterson Field, Ohio. There, the 38th continued the testing of the B-26, including its range and fuel efficiency. Immediately after the entry of the United States into World War II, plans were tentatively developed to send the 38th BG to the South West Pacific and to equip it with B-26Bs fitted with more auxiliary fuel tanks and provisions for carrying aerial torpedoes. Three 38th BG B-26Bs were detached to Midway Island in the buildup to the Battle of Midway, and two of them, along with two B-26s detached from the 22nd BG, carried out torpedo attacks against the Japanese Fleet on 4 June 1942. Two were shot down and the other two were so badly damaged that they were written off after the mission. Their torpedoes failed to hit any Japanese ships, although they did shoot down one Mitsubishi A6M Zero fighter and killed two seamen aboard the aircraft carrier Akagi with machine-gun fire. The crew of one B-26, Susie Q, after dropping their torpedo were pursued by fighters; seeking an escape route, they flew directly along the length of the Akagi, braving anti-aircraft fire – although the pursuing Japanese fighters had to hold fire temporarily, to avoid hitting the flagship. Another, after being seriously damaged by anti-aircraft fire, didn't pull out of its run, and instead headed directly for Akagis bridge. The aircraft, either attempting a suicide ramming, or out of control due to battle damage or a wounded or killed pilot, narrowly missed crashing into the carrier's bridge, before it cartwheeled into the sea.

From approximately June 1942, B-26 squadrons of the 38th BG were based in New Caledonia and Fiji. From New Caledonia, missions were flown against Japanese bases in the Solomon Islands. On one occasion, a B-26 was credited with shooting down a Kawanishi H6K flying boat. In 1943, it was decided that the B-26 would be phased out of operations in the South West Pacific Theater in favor of the North American B-25 Mitchell. Nevertheless, the 19th Bombardment Squadron of the 22nd BG continued to fly missions in the B-26. The B-26 flew its last combat mission in the theater on 9 January 1944.

Two more squadrons of torpedo armed B-26s equipped the 28th Composite Group and were used for anti-shipping operations in the Aleutian Islands Campaign, but there are no records of any successful torpedo attack by a USAAF B-26.

Comedian George Gobel famously joked about being an instructor for this aircraft at Frederick Army Airfield (now Frederick Regional Airport) during the Pacific battles, boasting that "not one Japanese aircraft got past Tulsa".

Mediterranean Theater
Three Bombardment Groups were allocated to support the Allied invasion of French North Africa in November 1942. They were initially used to carry out low-level attacks against heavily defended targets, incurring heavy losses with poor results, before switching to medium level attacks. By the end of the North African Campaign, the three B-26 groups had flown 1,587 sorties, losing 80 aircraft. This was double the loss rate of the B-25, which also flew 70% more sorties with fewer aircraft. Despite this, the B-26 continued in service with the Twelfth Air Force, supporting the Allied advance through Sicily, Italy and southern France. Air Marshal Sir John Slessor, Deputy Commander-in-Chief Mediterranean Allied Air Forces, wrote of "the astonishing accuracy of the experienced medium bomber groups – particularly the Marauders; I think that the 42nd Bombardment Group in Sardinia is probably the best day-bomber unit in the world." Slessor in fact meant the 42nd Bomb Wing—17th, 319th and 320th Bomb Groups—but a US 'wing' equated roughly to a British 'group', and vice versa.

Northwest Europe

The B-26 entered service with the Eighth Air Force in England in early 1943, with the 322nd Bombardment Group flying its first missions in May 1943. Operations were similar to those flown in North Africa with B-26s flying at low level and were unsuccessful. The second mission, an unescorted attack on a power station at IJmuiden, Netherlands, resulted in the loss of the entire attacking force of 11 B-26s to anti-aircraft fire and Luftwaffe Focke-Wulf Fw 190 fighters. Following this disaster, the UK-based B-26 force was switched to medium altitude operations, and transferred to the Ninth Air Force, set up to support the planned invasion of France.

The Marauder, operating from medium altitude, proved to be a highly accurate aircraft, with the 9th Air Force rating it the most accurate bomber available in the final month of the war in Europe. Loss rates were far lower than in the early, low-level days, with the B-26 stated by the 9th Air Force as having the lowest loss rate in the European Theater of Operations at less than 0.5%.

The B-26 flew its last combat missions against the German garrison at the Île d'Oléron on 1 May 1945, with the last units disbanding in early 1946.

British Commonwealth
In 1942, a batch of 52 B-26A Marauders (designated Marauder I by the RAF) were offered to the United Kingdom under Lend-Lease. Like the earlier Martin Maryland and Baltimore, these aircraft were sent to the Mediterranean, replacing the Bristol Blenheims of No. 14 Squadron in Egypt. The Squadron flew its first operational mission on 6 November 1942, being used for long range reconnaissance, mine-laying and anti-shipping strikes. Unlike the USAAF, 14 Squadron made productive use of the equipment for carrying torpedoes, sinking several merchant ships with this weapon. The Marauder also proved useful in disrupting enemy air transport, shooting down considerable numbers of German and Italian transport aircraft flying between Italy and North Africa.

In 1943, deliveries of 100 long-wingspan B-26C-30s (Marauder II) allowed two squadrons of the South African Air Force, 12 and 24 Squadron to be equipped, these being used for bombing missions over the Aegean Sea, Crete and Italy. A further 350 B-26Fs and Gs were supplied in 1944, with two more South African squadrons (21 and 30) joining No 12 and 24 in Italy to form an all-Marauder equipped wing, while one further SAAF squadron (25) and a new RAF squadron (39 Squadron), re-equipped with Marauders as part of the Balkan Air Force supporting Tito's Partisans in Yugoslavia. A Marauder of 25 Squadron SAAF, shot down on the unit's last mission of World War II on 4 May 1945, was the last Marauder lost in combat by any user. The British and South African aircraft were quickly scrapped following the end of the war, the United States not wanting the return of the Lend-Lease aircraft.

France
Following Operation Torch, (the Allied invasion of North Africa), the Free French Air Force re-equipped three squadrons with Marauders for medium-bombing operations in Italy and the Allied invasion of southern France. These B-26s replaced Lioré et Olivier LeO 451s and Douglas DB-7s. Toward the end of the war, seven of the nine French Groupes de Bombardement used the Marauder, taking part in 270 missions with 4,884 aircraft sorties in combat. Free French B-26 groups were disbanded in June 1945. Replaced in squadron service by 1947, two lingered on as testbeds for the Snecma Atar jet engine, one of these remaining in use until 1958.

Corporate operations

In the immediate post-war years, a small number of Marauders were converted as high-speed executive transports, accommodating up to fifteen passengers. The specifications of the individual conversions differed considerably. The example shown in the image was completed in 1948 and had streamlined nose and tail fairings and windows inserted in the rear fuselage. It served United Airlines before being sold to Mexico. It was purchased by the Confederate Air Force and restored to wartime markings for air display purposes before being lost in a fatal crash in 1995.

Variants

 B-26 — The first 201 planes were ordered based upon design alone. Prototypes were not characterized with the usual "X" or "Y" designations. They had Pratt & Whitney R-2800-5 engines. Armament consisted of two .30 caliber and two .50 caliber machine guns. (The last model was armed with nearly three times that number.) Approximate cost then: $80,226.80/aircraft (201 built).
 B-26A — Incorporated changes made on the production line to the B-26, including upgrading the two .30 caliber machine guns in the nose and tail to .50 caliber. A total of 52 B-26As were delivered to the Royal Air Force, which were used as the Marauder Mk I. Approximate cost then: $102,659.33/aircraft (139 built)
 B-26B — Model with further improvements on the B-26A, including revised tail gunner's glazing. Nineteen were delivered to the Royal Air Force as the Marauder Mk.IA. Production blocks of the 1,883 aircraft built:
 AT-23A or TB-26B—208 B-26Bs converted into target tugs and gunnery trainers designated JM-1 by the US Navy.
 B-26B—Single tail gun replaced with twin guns; belly-mounted "tunnel gun" added. (81 built)
 B-26B-1—Improved B-26B. (225 built)
 B-26B-2—Pratt & Whitney R-2800-41 radials. (96 built)
 B-26B-3—Larger carburetor intakes; upgrade to R-2800-43 radials. (28 built)
 B-26B-4—Improved B-26B-3.  (211 built)
Armament was increased from six to twelve .50 caliber machine guns; this was done in the forward section so that the B-26 could perform strafing missions. The tail gun was upgraded from manual to power operated. Armor was added to protect the pilot and copilot. (1,242 built)
 CB-26B—12 B-26Bs were converted into transport aircraft (all were delivered to the US Marine Corps for use in the Philippines).
 B-26C—Designation assigned to those B-26Bs built in Omaha, Nebraska instead of Baltimore, Maryland. Although nominally the B-26B-10 was the first variant to receive the longer wing, it was actually installed on B-26Cs before the B-26B-10, both being in production simultaneously. A total of 123 B-26Cs were used by the RAF and SAAF as the Marauder Mk II. Approximate cost then: $138,551.27/aircraft (1,210 built)
 TB-26C—Originally designated AT-23B. Trainer modification of B-26C. (Approximately 300 modified)
 XB-26D—Modified B-26 used to test hot air de-icing equipment, in which heat exchangers transferred heat from engine exhaust to air circulated to the leading and trailing edges of the wing and empennage surfaces. This system, while promising, was not incorporated into any production aircraft made during World War II. (One converted)
 B-26E—Modified B-26B constructed to test the effectiveness of moving the dorsal gun turret from the aft fuselage to just behind the cockpit. The offensive and defensive abilities of the B-26E were tested in combat simulations against normal aircraft. Although the tests showed that gains were made with the new arrangement, they were insignificant. After a cost analysis, it was concluded that the benefit did not justify the effort needed to convert production lines for the new turret position. (One converted)
 B-26F—Angle-of-incidence of wings increased by 3.5º; fixed .50 caliber machine gun in nose removed; tail turret and associated armor improved. The first B-26F was produced in February 1944. One hundred of these were B-26F-1-MAs. Starting with 42-96231, a revised oil cooler was added, along with wing bottom panels redesigned for easier removal. A total of 200 of the 300 aircraft were B-26F-2s and F-6s, all of which were used by the RAF and SAAF as the Marauder Mk III. The F-2 had the Bell M-6 power turret replaced by an M-6A with a flexible canvas cover over the guns. The T-1 bombsight was installed instead of the M-series sight. British bomb fusing and radio equipment were provided. (300 built)
 B-26G—B-26F with standardized interior equipment. A total of 150 bombers were used by the RAF as the Marauder Mk III. (893 built)
 TB-26G—B-26G converted for crew training. Most, possibly all, were delivered to the United States Navy as the JM-2.  (57 converted)
 XB-26H—Test aircraft for tandem landing gear, and nicknamed the "Middle River Stump Jumper" from its "bicycle" gear configuration, to see if it could be used on the Martin XB-48. (One converted)
 JM-1P—A small number of JM-1s were converted into photo-reconnaissance aircraft for the US Navy.
Marauder I
British designation for 52 B-26As for the Royal Air Force.
Marauder IA
British designation for 19 B-26Bs for the Royal Air Force.
Marauder II
British designation for 123 B-26Cs for the Royal Air Force; 100 passed on to South African Air Force and supported invasion of Italy
Marauder III
British designation for 200 B-26F and 150 B-26G for the Royal Air Force and South African Air Force.

With the exception of the B-26C, all models and variants of the B-26 were produced at Martin's Middle River, Maryland manufacturing plant. The B-26C was built at the Martin plant in Omaha, Nebraska

Operators

 Free France

 South African Air Force

 Royal Air Force

 United States Army Air Corps
 United States Army Air Forces
 United States Marine Corps
 United States Navy

Surviving aircraft

France
B-26G
 44-68219 Dinah Might - Utah Beach Museum (Musée du Débarquement Utah Beach) on loan from the Musée de l'Air et de l'Espace in Le Bourget. It was previously recovered from the Air France training school.

United States
Airworthy
B-26
 40-1464 – part of the Fantasy of Flight collection in Polk City, Florida.

On display
B-26
 40-1459 Charley's Jewel – MAPS Air Museum in Akron, Ohio.
B-26G
 43-34581 Shootin In – National Museum of the United States Air Force at Wright-Patterson AFB in Dayton, Ohio. This aircraft was flown in combat by the Free French Air Force during the final months of World War II. It was obtained from the mechanics' training school of French airline Air France near Paris in June 1965. It is painted as a 9th Air Force B-26B assigned to the 387th Bombardment Group in 1945.

Under restoration
B-26
 40-1370 – for display by Aircraft Restoration Services LLC, Murrieta, California.
 40-1501 – for display by David Tallichet's Military Aircraft Restoration Corporation of Anaheim, California; at the Pima Air & Space Museum, adjacent to Davis-Monthan AFB in Tucson, Arizona.
B-26B
 41-31773 Flak Bait – for display at the Steven F. Udvar-Hazy Center of the National Air and Space Museum in Chantilly, Virginia. This aircraft survived 207 operational missions over Europe, more than any other American aircraft during World War II.

Specifications (B-26G)

Media appearances

None listed.

See also

References

Notes

Citations

Bibliography

 Birdsall, Steve. (1981) B-26 Marauder in Action (Aircraft number 50). Carrollton, Texas: Squadron/Signal Publications, Inc.. .
 Bridgman, Leonard.  "The Martin Model 179 Marauder". Jane's Fighting Aircraft of World War II. London: Studio, 1946. .
 Brown, Kenneth. Marauder Man: World War II in the Crucial but Little Known B-26 Marauder Medium Bomber. Pacifica, California: Pacifica Press, 2001. .
 Donald, David, ed. American Warplanes of World War II. London: Aerospace Publishing, 1995. .
 Ehrhardt, Patrick. Les Marauders Français (in French). Ostwald, France: Editions du Polygone, 2006. .
 Ethell, L. Jeffrey. (1995) Aircraft of World War II.  Glasgow: HarperCollins Publishers. .
 Forsyth, Robert and Jerry Scutts. (2000) Battle over Bavaria: The B-26 Marauder versus the German Jets, April 1945. Crowborough, UK: Classic Publications. .
 Freeman, Roger A. B-26 Marauder at War. London: Ian Allan Ltd., 1977. .
 Green, William. The Aircraft of the World. London: Macdonald & Co. (Publishers) Ltd Third edition 1965.
 Green, William. Famous Bombers of the Second World War (2nd ed.). New York: Doubleday, 1975. .
 Hall, Tom. "Breaking in the B-26." American Aviation Historical Society Journal, Spring 1992.
 Havener, Jack K. The Martin B-26 Marauder. Murfreesboro, Tennessee: Southern Heritage Press, 1997. .
 Hunter, Lawrence Jack. The Flying Prostitute. Lincoln, Nebraska: iUniverse.com, 2000. .
 Johnsen, Frederick A. Martin B-26 Marauder. North Branch, Minnesota: Specialty Press, 2000. .
 Johnson, E.R. American Attack Aircraft Since 1926. Jefferson, North Carolina: McFarland, 2008. .
 Listemann, Phil H. Allied Wings No. 2: Martin Marauder Mk.I. France: www.raf-in-combat.com, 2008. .
 "Marauder: Mr Martin's Mean Machine" Part 1. Air International, January 1988, Vol. 34, No. 1, pp. 22–29, 49. Bromley, UK: Fine Scroll. ISSN 0306-5634.
 "Marauder: Mr Martin's Mean Machine: Part Two". Air International, February 1988, Vol. 34, No. 2, pp. 75–82, 94. Bromley, UK: Fine Scroll. ISSN 0306-5634.
 March, Daniel J. British Warplanes of World War II. London: Aerospace Publishing, 1998. .
 McCullough, David. Truman. New York: Simon & Schuster, 2003. .
 Mendenhall, Charles. Deadly Duo: The B-25 and B-26 in WWII. North Branch, Minnesota: Specialty Press, 1981. .
 Moench, John O. Marauder Men: An Account of the B-26 Marauder. Longwood, Florida: Malia Enterprises, 1989. .
 Moore, Carl H. WWII: Flying the B-26 Marauder over Europe. Blue Ridge Summit, Pennsylvania: McGraw-Hill/TAB Books, 1980. .
 Nowicki, Jacek and Andre R. Zbiegniewski. Martin B-26, Vol. 1 (Militaria 137) (in Polish). Warsaw, Poland: Wydawnictwo Militaria, 2001. .
 O'Mahony, Charles. "Me & My Gal: The Stormy Combat Romance Between a WWII Bomber Pilot and his Martin B-26." Wings, December 1994.
 Parshall, Jonathon and Anthony Tulley. Shattered Sword: The Untold Story of the Battle of Midway. Washington D.C.: Potomac Books, 2005. .
 Rehr, Louis S. and Carleton R. Rehr. Marauder: Memoir of a B-26 Pilot in Europe in World War II. Jefferson, North Carolina: McFarland & Company, Inc, 2003. .
 Scutts, Jerry. B-26 Marauder Units of the Eighth and Ninth Air Forces. Botley, UK: Osprey Publishing Ltd., 1997. .
 Slessor, Sir John. The Central Blue. New York: Fredrick A. Praeger, Inc., 1957.
 Swanborough, F.G. and Peter M. Bowers. United States Military Aircraft since 1909. London: Putnam, First edition, 1963.
 Swanborough, Gordon and Peter M. Bowers. United States Navy Aircraft Since 1911. Annapolis, Maryland: Naval Institute Press, 1990. .
 Tannehill, Victor C. Boomerang, Story of the 320th Bombardment Group in World War II. Self-published.
 Tannehill, Victor C. The Martin Marauder B-26. Arvada, Colorado: Boomerang Publishers, 1997. .
 Trent, Jack. " 'Fat-Bottomed Girls': The Martin B-26 Marauder." Scale Aircraft Modeller, Volume 14, No. 7, July 2008.
 United States Air Force Museum Guidebook. Wright-Patterson AFB, Ohio: Air Force Museum Foundation, 1975.
 Wagner, Ray. The Martin B-26B & C Marauder (Aircraft in Profile No. 112). Windsor, Berkshire, UK: Profile Publications Ltd., 1965. Reprinted 1971.

External links

 Baugher, Joe. "Martin B-26 Marauder." Encyclopedia of American Aircraft.
 
 The Army Asked For A Miracle – The Answer Was The B-26 early 1943 article, photos of early B-26s
 B-26 Marauder Digital Collection at The University of Akron Archival Services
 b26.com Site dedicated to the crews that flew the Marauder

1940s United States bomber aircraft
B-26
Shoulder-wing aircraft
Aircraft first flown in 1940
World War II bombers of the United States
World War II medium bombers
Twin piston-engined tractor aircraft